SS Carnatic was a British steamship built in 1862-63 by Samuda Brothers at Cubitt Town on the Isle of Dogs, London, for the Peninsular and Oriental Steam Navigation Company (P&O). She operated on the Suez to Bombay run in the last years before the Suez Canal was opened. This route gave a fast, steamship-operated route from Britain to India, connecting with similar steamships running through the Mediterranean to Alexandria, with an overland crossing to Suez. The alternative was to sail round the Cape of Good Hope, a distance at which steam ships were not, in the early 1860s, sufficiently economical to be commercially competitive with sail.

As one of the first British steamships to use a compound engine, Carnatic achieved a much better fuel economy (at 2lbs of coal per indicated horsepower-hour) than most other contemporary steamers. P&O had a number of compound-engined ships built in the first half of the 1860s: Poonah (1863), Golconda (1863) and Baronda (1864).

In 1869, she ran aground on a coral reef in the Red Sea and broke apart the following morning, with the loss of 31 lives. Her wreck was rediscovered in 1984 and is now a popular scuba diving site.

Ship history
The ship was laid down in early 1862, and was originally to be named Mysore. She was launched as Carnatic on 12 June 1862, and completed on 25 April 1863. The composite construction hull (iron-framed and wooden-planked) was fitted with square-rigged sails and a 4-cylinder compound inverted steam engine by Humphrys & Tennant, providing  to a single propeller.

The compound engine was unusual at the time for a British vessel. Carnatic's boiler ran at only . Higher pressures were not allowed by the Board of Trade. The advantages of a compound engine were not fully realised at this low pressure - but the solution to the problem was to apply a large amount of superheat. The efficiency gained was a fuel usage of just over 2lbs of coal per indicated horsepower-hour.

Grounding
On 12 September 1869, she ran aground on Sha`b Abu Nuhas coral reef near Shadwan Island at the mouth of the Gulf of Suez in the Red Sea. Having assessed the ship to be safe and the pumps intact, Captain P. B. Jones denied passengers' repeated requests to abandon ship, and reassured them that the ship was safe and that the P&O liner Sumatra was due to pass by and would rescue them. There was a general air of calm and normality on board until about 2 a.m. on the 14th, when the rising water engulfed the ship's boilers and the ship was left without power or light. At 11 a.m. the following morning, after 34 hours on the reef, Captain Jones had just given the order to abandon ship and the first four passengers had taken their seats in one of the lifeboats when Carnatic suddenly broke in half. Thirty-one people drowned. The survivors made it to barren island of Shadwan, where the next day the Sumatra rescued them.

Carnatic was carrying £40,000 worth of gold (well in excess of £1,000,000 in modern terms), so the wreck was the subject of a salvage operation two weeks later. All the gold was reported recovered, but persistent rumours of remaining treasure have added to the romance of the ship.

Captain Jones was recalled to England to face an official Board of Inquiry, which labelled him "a skilful and experienced officer". However, the inquiry added that "it appears there was every condition as regards ship, weather and light to ensure a safe voyage and there was needed only proper care. This was not done, and hence the disaster." Although Jones's Master's certificate was suspended for only nine months, he never returned to sea.

Rediscovered in May 1984, the wreck of the Carnatic is now a popular scuba diving site.

References

External links 
 
 A victim of the Carnatic disaster

1862 ships
Ships built in Cubitt Town
Steamships of the United Kingdom
Ships of P&O (company)
Around the World in Eighty Days
Shipwrecks in the Red Sea
Maritime incidents in September 1869
Wreck diving sites